Barend is a Dutch patronymic surname and it may refer to:

 Johnny Barend (1929–2011), American professional wrestler
 Samara Barend (born ca. 1978), American politician
 Sonja Barend (born 1940), Dutch television personality

See also
 Barend, a common Dutch given name
 Barends (disambiguation)

Dutch-language surnames
Patronymic surnames
Surnames from given names